Cristóbal Cruz Rivera, also known as Lacandón (born 19 May 1977) is a Mexican professional boxer and former IBO and IBF featherweight Champion.

Career
On 17 January 1992, Cruz began his professional career, beating fellow Mexican debutant Manuel Morales with a second round knockout in Monterrey.

After racking up 24 fights with 21 wins and 11 knockouts in just over tens years, Cruz faced Francisco Dianzo for the WBC Continental Americas featherweight title. Cruz overcame Dianzo in the eleventh round about would beat him again in 2005 with a 6th-round knockout.

Road to the IBF title
Between October 2005 and May 2007 Cruz's career looked to be coming to an end when he had seven fights with four losses and a no contest including two losses to Francisco Lorenzo.

In August 2007, Cruz started back on the comeback trail when he defeated Alberto Garza with a tenth-round knockout to capture the WBC FECOMBOX featherweight title. This victory lead to a shot at the IBO featherweight title against South African champion Thomas Mashaba who had only one loss in a ten-year 25 fight career. The clash took place in March 2008 at the Foxwoods Casino, Connecticut. The pair fought twelve tough rounds with Cruz having blood running from his nose from the eighth round onwards. In a major upset Cruz finished strongly breaking CompuBox record for punches thrown in a 12-round fight to take the victory by majority decision with one judge calling the fight even and two giving it to Cruz by one solitary round.

In October 2008, Cruz would vacate his newfound IBO title and aim for a bigger prize - the IBF featherweight title - which had been recently vacated by Robert Guerrero who moved up to super featherweight. He faced fellow Mexican Orlando Salido who had won an eliminator less than a year previous and had fought for the title previously, losing to Juan Manuel Márquez in 2004, his only loss since 2001 and a no contest again Guerrero in 2006. Once again Cruz overcame the odds to defeat the bookies favourite to take one of the most prestigious titles in boxing by beating a battered and swollen Salido on points.

He followed this up with a defeat of once-beaten Jorge Solís, avenging a loss earlier in his career.

Professional boxing record

See also
List of IBF world champions
List of Mexican boxing world champions

References

External links
 Biography and Pictures
 

Boxers from Chiapas
1977 births
Living people
International Boxing Federation champions
Featherweight boxers
Mexican male boxers
20th-century Mexican people
21st-century Mexican people